Empey is the surname of:

 Arthur Guy Empey (1883–1963), American author, screenwriter and movie producer
 James Empey (born 1996), American football player
 Ralph Empey (1904–1960), Australian rules footballer
 Reg Empey (born 1947), Northern Ireland politician
 Walton Empey (born 1934), former Archbishop of Dublin

English-language surnames